Ambalamedu High School (AHS) was a school in Kerala, India.  AHS provided co-curricular activities including Nature Club, Maths Club, Science Club, School band, Youth Festival, Scouts, Guides and NCC.

Formation
The school was inaugurated on 18 May 1970, the first SSLC batch in 1973 had four students. It maintained a continuous 100% pass in the SSLC board examinations. It was run by the Cochin Division of the Fertilizers and Chemicals Travancore Ltd (FACT). The school enjoyed an all-pass status till 2004, the last year of its run under FACT before it was leased out to a private management.

Tenure under TocH Residential Public School
Ambalamedu High School was handed over to TocH Residential Public School (Prabhat Residential Public School) in 2004. The private firm ran the school for five years and handed in back to FACT in 2009. A trust formed under a society in FACT managed the school for another two years for the sake of the students who were in class nine and ten. It closed down in 2011.

Closure
The school was closed down at the end of 2011, as the company refused to run it any longer. The school today exists only in the realm of memory. Mr. V Gopalakrishna Pillai was the last headmaster of the school.

Notable alumni
 former NASA scientist Rajeev Nambiar, 
 student scientist Manu S. Madhav, who was part of NASA's Mars Redrover project, 
 Dr Hafeez Rahman, chairman of Sunrise Hospitals, 
 CA.Dr. Binoy J. Kattadiyil, Economist; managing director, IPA, Insolvency & Bankruptcy Board of India,
 actor Krishnakumar.
 Ananthu M

External links
School alumni website
A Facebook page to confess about the sins the students have committed during their school days

References

Schools in Ernakulam district
Defunct schools in India